The Truman National Security Project is a United States Democratic Party-aligned national security and leadership development organization based in Washington, D.C. It serves to organize center-left to progressive Americans on issues of national security and foreign policy. The organization is named after President Harry S. Truman. It was founded in 2004 by Rachel Kleinfeld, an international relations scholar and Democratic activist, and Matthew Spence.

Activities
The Project provides training and messaging programs on national security issues for congressional and executive agency staff in Washington. It appoints fellows from among Americans interested in foreign policy and provides networking opportunities for its fellows. The Truman Project has three cohorts of fellows:

 Defense Council - veterans, active duty military, intel community, and defense civilians on the frontlines of where policy becomes reality 
 Security Fellows - academics, policy professionals, and other folks involved in making policy from Washington, DC
 Political Partners - elected officials, political staff, and professionals working in elections and politics who are experts in talking about complex foreign and domestic policy issues

According to Kleinfeld, the Truman Project avoids discussion of Israel policy because it is already covered by other groups.

The Truman Project endorsed the For the People Act of 2019.

Funding
In 2011, the Truman Project's budget was around $4 million. It has received grants from Herbert and Marion Sandler, Carnegie Endowment for International Peace and the Ploughshares Fund.

Personnel
Co-founder Matthew Spence remains active on the Board. Hunter Biden is a former Board Member and Vice Chairman of the Truman National Security Project.

Reception
According to Tablet Magazine, some progressives are uncomfortable with the Truman Project’s pro-military stance which they describe as "Republicanism lite".

References

External links
 

Civic and political organizations of the United States
Left-wing politics in the United States
Think tanks based in Washington, D.C.
Harry S. Truman
Foreign policy political advocacy groups in the United States
Think tanks based in the United States